Jörg Lindemeier (born 30 August 1968) is a Namibian swimmer. Lindemeier competed at the 1992, 1996 and 2000 Summer Olympics for Namibia. He was born in Windhoek. He won a gold medal in the 200 metres breaststroke at the 1991 All-Africa Games.

References

External links

1968 births
Sportspeople from Windhoek
White Namibian people
Namibian people of German descent
Living people
Namibian male swimmers
Olympic swimmers of Namibia
Swimmers at the 1992 Summer Olympics
Swimmers at the 1996 Summer Olympics
Swimmers at the 2000 Summer Olympics
Commonwealth Games competitors for Namibia
Swimmers at the 1998 Commonwealth Games
African Games gold medalists for Namibia
African Games medalists in swimming
Competitors at the 1991 All-Africa Games
Male breaststroke swimmers